Folkestone Gardens is a small urban park located in Deptford, south east London. Now part of the London Borough of Lewisham, it was created during the 1970s on an area badly damaged by bombs in World War II. The park was named after a street of railwaymen's houses that once stood on part of the site.

The nearest bus stop is at Surrey Canal Road opposite the park. The closest Transport for London stations are at Surrey Quays, Canada Water and New Cross.

Folkestone Gardens is within  of the Surrey Canal regeneration site.

History of the site 

Folkestone Gardens is a man-made urban park on a plot of land that was formerly high-density housing. On 7 March 1945, the area was badly damaged by a V-2 rocket, resulting in the loss of over 50 lives. In the late 1960s and early '70s, the area was cleared and the park was subsequently laid out over part of Folkestone Gardens and also Oareboro Road, an L-shaped street of terraced houses.

Geography and layout 

It is adjacent to Trundleys Road on the western side and Rolt Street to the south. To the north it incorporates an area that was formerly the Grand Surrey Canal. Railway lines border the northern and eastern boundaries of Folkestone Gardens. These include a viaduct of what was the London and Greenwich Railway, the first railway in London built specifically for passengers, and the first to be elevated.

The undulating site is landscaped and includes walkways, woodland areas and a large pond on the north-western side. The pond has an island with a large weeping willow and pond-side plants, some of which were taken from surplus stock at Blackheath's's Hare and Billet pond during restoration in 1994. Other tree specimens include Lombardy poplars and a group of sycamores. The park supports a diverse range of flora and fauna for its size and location.

The Quietway 1 cycle route runs through the park.

Facilities 

Facilities include a children's play area, a ball court, and a new, concrete skate park.
The skate park was the source of local controversy, with the Council allocating funding for the skatepark, but not the play area, despite the consultation documentation outlining that the development was to incorporate regeneration of both. A number of safety concerns with the skatepark continue to exist, such as the open pathway directly from the skate area out to the main road (as of April 2016, this has been temporarily secured with a plastic fence).

A new restaurant and wine bar is now open within the park.

References

External links 
Lewisham borough: details of parks

Parks and open spaces in the London Borough of Lewisham
Deptford
Redevelopment projects in London